Suyo, officially the Municipality of Suyo, is a 4th class municipality in the province of Ilocos Sur, Philippines. According to the 2020 census, it has a population of 10,766 people.

Geography

Barangays
Suyo is politically subdivided into 8 barangays. These barangays are headed by elected officials: Barangay Captain, Barangay Council, whose members are called Barangay Councilors. All are elected every three years.

 Baringcucurong
 Cabugao
 Man-atong
 Patoc-ao
 Poblacion (Kimpusa)
 Suyo Proper
 Urzadan
 Uso

Climate

Demographics

In the 2020 census, Suyo had a population of 10,766.

Economy

Government
Suyo, belonging to the second congressional district of the province of Ilocos Sur, is governed by a mayor designated as its local chief executive and by a municipal council as its legislative body in accordance with the Local Government Code. The mayor, vice mayor, and the councilors are elected directly by the people through an election which is being held every three years.

Elected officials

References

External links

Pasyalang Ilocos Sur
Philippine Standard Geographic Code
Philippine Census Information
Local Governance Performance Management System

Municipalities of Ilocos Sur